Sarmeshk (also known as Sarmoshk) is a village in Hanza Rural District of Rabor County, Kerman Province, Iran. At the 2011 census, its population was 1699.

References 

Populated places in Rabor County